Territorial Assembly elections were held in French Sudan on 31 March 1957, the first elections in the territory to be held under universal suffrage. The result was a victory for the Sudanese Union – African Democratic Rally. which won 57 of the 70 seats. Voter turnout was just 34.0%.

Results

Elected MPs
Of the 70 elected members, 30 were members of the intelligentsia, 30 were employees, five were merchants, two were traditional chiefs, two were farmers and one was a worker.

Aftermath
Following the elections, the Union of the Populations of Bandiagara merged into the Sudanese Union – African Democratic Rally, giving it a total of 64 seats.

References

1957 in French Sudan
French Sudan
Elections in Mali
Election and referendum articles with incomplete results